The Ransdell Act (ch. 251, codified as amended at ,), reorganized, expanded and redesignated the Laboratory of Hygiene (created in 1887) as the National Institute of Health.

Congress appropriated $750,000 in the bill for construction of facilities and research fellowships. The NIH grew into today's 27-unit National Institutes of Health).

The Ransdell Act was sponsored by and named for Joseph E. Ransdell, a United States senator for the state of Louisiana.

References

1930 in law
United States federal health legislation
National Institutes of Health